Kazuhiro Nakamura (born 1 September 1980) is a Japanese former ski jumper.

References

External links

1980 births
Living people
Japanese male ski jumpers
Place of birth missing (living people)